Maurizio Rattini (born 13 November 1949) is a Sammarinese politician who was a Captain Regent, from 1 April 2012 to 1 October 2012, with Italo Righi. He also served as a Captain Regent from 1 October 1996 - 1 April 1997, with Gian Carlo Venturini.

References

1949 births
Living people
People from the City of San Marino
Captains Regent of San Marino
Members of the Grand and General Council